The Archangel Raphael and Tobias with Two Saints is an undated oil on panel painting by Cima da Conegliano, now in the Gallerie dell'Accademia in Venice. To the left of the work is James the Great and to the right is Nicholas of Bari.

References

15th-century paintings
16th-century paintings
Paintings of Raphael (archangel)
Paintings of James the Great
Paintings of Saint Nicholas
Paintings depicting Tobias
Paintings in the Gallerie dell'Accademia
Paintings by Cima da Conegliano